Aiganothrips is a genus of thrips in the family Phlaeothripidae.

Species
 Aiganothrips hystrix

References

Phlaeothripidae
Thrips genera